No. 24 Squadron RSAF is a squadron of the Royal Saudi Air Force that operates the Airbus A330 MRTT from Prince Sultan Air Base, Al-Kharj.

References

24